Sorrell Aviation was an American aircraft manufacturer based in Tenino, Washington, founded by Hobart C Sorrell and sons John, Mark and Tim in about 1958. The company specialized in the design and manufacture of light aircraft in the form of plans and kits for amateur construction including for the US FAR 103 Ultralight Vehicles rules.

The company's first design was the Sorrell Dr.1, a single seat, 3/4 scale replica of the First World War Fokker Dr.1 triplane that was produced in 1957.

Well known for designing negative-stagger cabin biplanes, the company produced the single seat homebuilt Sorrell Guppy, first flying in 1967. The aerobatic Sorrell Hiperbipe was introduced in 1973. A later design of the company was the 1983 single-seat Sorrell SNS-8 Hiperlight design for the US FAR 103 ultralight category. It was sold initially by Sunrise Aircraft of Sheridan, Oregon and was still in production by Thunderbird Aviation of Ray, Michigan in 2015.

The company's final design was the 1985 two seat version of the SNS-8, the Sorrell SNS-9 Hiperlight, which also remained in production in 2015 by Thunderbird Aviation.

Aircraft

References

External links

Defunct aircraft manufacturers of the United States
Ultralight aircraft
Homebuilt aircraft
Replica aircraft manufacturers